Madhubani Assembly constituency is an assembly constituency in Madhubani district in the Indian state of Bihar.  In 2015 Bihar Legislative Assembly election, Madhubani will be one of the 36 seats to have VVPAT enabled electronic voting machines.

Overview
As per Delimitation of Parliamentary and Assembly constituencies Order, 2008, No. 36  Madhubani Assembly constituency is composed of the following: Madhubani municipality; Basuara, Bhachhi, Bhavara, Lachhminagar, Sonaur, Maksuda, Khajuri, Shambhuar, Sundarpur, Bhitthi, Balia gram panchayats of Madhubani community development block; and Pandaul CD Block.

Madhubani Assembly constituency is part of No. 6 Madhubani (Lok Sabha constituency).

Members of Legislative Assembly

Election results

2020

References

External links
 

Assembly constituencies of Bihar
Politics of Madhubani district